AfroFoodtv.com is a website that is dedicated to African food and lifestyle. The site was launched in September 2006 by Yetunde “Yeti” Ezeanii in Atlanta, Georgia. Ezeanii serves as the chef and hostess of the website.

Content

Recipes

Africa is a continent of more than 50 countries, at different levels of development, using a wide variety of cooking styles and ingredients. The recipes offered on AfroFoodtv.com represent some of the well-known, classic dishes from the various regions of the continent. And as the Web site has evolved, some of the recipes now incorporate African flavors into traditional Western dishes such as pizza and hamburgers.

The recipe section is broken down into the following areas: staples, soups, stews, chicken, fish, meat, snacks and sides.

Videos

AfroFoodtv.com has a video library with over 40 demonstrations of recipes. These videos are hosted by Ezeanii.

Creator

Ezeanii has written and been featured in several articles on African cuisine in such publications as Nigeria World (online newspaper),  Munaluchi (African bridal magazine), and The Sunday Paper  Ezeanii is also the host of the "Taste of Africa" by Afrofoodtv food show twice weekly on Afrotainment Television which is on the dish network channel 751. This makes "Taste of Africa" by Afrofoodtv the only currently running food television show dedicated exclusively to African cuisine.

See also
 List of websites about food and drink

References

External links
AfroFoodtv.com

American cooking websites
Nigerian cuisine